Callistola is a genus of tortoise and leaf-mining beetles in the tribe Cryptonychini.

Species 
 Callistola attenuata Gressitt, 1963
 Callistola boisduvali (Weise, 1908)
 Callistola bomberiana Gressitt, 1963
 Callistola corporaali (Uhmann, 1932)
 Callistola cyclops Gressitt, 1963
 Callistola devastator Gressitt, 1960
 Callistola elegans Gressitt, 1960
 Callistola fasciata Weise, 1905
 Callistola freycinetella Gressitt, 1963
 Callistola maai Gressitt, 1960
 Callistola margaretae Gressitt, 1963
 Callistola metselaari Gressitt, 1960
 Callistola ruficollis (Spaeth, 1936)
 Callistola sedlacekana Gressitt, 1963
 Callistola subvirida Gressitt, 1963
 Callistola tricolor Gressitt, 1963

References

External links 
 

Cassidinae
Chrysomelidae genera